Kabaklar is a village in the İslahiye District, Gaziantep Province, Turkey. The village had a population of 226 in 2022. The village is inhabited by Tahtacı, a subgroup of Alevi Turkomans, who belong to the Hacı Emirli ocak.

References

Villages in İslahiye District